Motocross Go! is an arcade game developed and published by Namco in 1998.

Gameplay
Motocross Go! is a dirt bike racing game for one player.

Reception
Next Generation reviewed the arcade version of the game, rating it two stars out of five, and stated that "Motocross Go! is sure to fade like the expensive, forgettable set of jet ski units that most frugal arcade operators skipped without ever blinking."

References

1998 video games
Arcade video games
Arcade-only video games
Namco arcade games
Namco games
Racing video games
Video games developed in Japan